Miller Mountain is a peak located in Wyoming County, Pennsylvania. This mountain is one of the more recognizable peaks in the Endless Mountains region of the Commonwealth. Miller Mountain is a "stand alone" peak from the rest of the Allegheny Plateau.

References

External links

Mountains of Pennsylvania
Landforms of Wyoming County, Pennsylvania